Burnside is a suburb of Christchurch, New Zealand, located southeast of Christchurch International Airport. As with most suburbs in Christchurch, it has no defined boundaries and is a general area.

History
It was named for the small creeks that formed the headwaters of the Waimairi Stream. The name Burnside was made official by the Waimairi County Council in 1959,
although Burnside Road had been renamed Memorial Avenue in 1950.

For the first hundred years of European settlement, the area in and around Burnside was farmland, with sheep, cattle and orchards occupying the land.

Demographics

Burnside had a population of 7,713 at the 2018 New Zealand census, an increase of 378 people (5.2%) since the 2013 census, and an increase of 522 people (7.3%) since the 2006 census. There were 2,712 households. There were 3,810 males and 3,903 females, giving a sex ratio of 0.98 males per female, with 1,458 people (18.9%) aged under 15 years, 1,683 (21.8%) aged 15 to 29, 3,372 (43.7%) aged 30 to 64, and 1,200 (15.6%) aged 65 or older.

Ethnicities were 70.2% European/Pākehā, 7.2% Māori, 2.9% Pacific peoples, 24.6% Asian, and 3.1% other ethnicities (totals add to more than 100% since people could identify with multiple ethnicities).

The proportion of people born overseas was 32.6%, compared with 27.1% nationally.

Although some people objected to giving their religion, 47.9% had no religion, 39.1% were Christian, 1.4% were Hindu, 1.6% were Muslim, 2.0% were Buddhist and 2.3% had other religions.

Of those at least 15 years old, 1,788 (28.6%) people had a bachelor or higher degree, and 780 (12.5%) people had no formal qualifications. The employment status of those at least 15 was that 3,024 (48.3%) people were employed full-time, 1,023 (16.4%) were part-time, and 219 (3.5%) were unemployed.

Schools

Burnside High School is a secondary school catering for years 9 to 13. The school opened in 1960.

Cobham Intermediate is an intermediate school catering for years 7 to 8. The school, initially named Fendalton Intermediate, opened in 1963.

Burnside Primary School and Roydvale School are contributing primary schools catering for years 1 to 6. Burnside School opened in 1956, and Roydvale in 1967. Kendal School, which opened in 1962, closed in 2014.

Christ the King School is a state-integrated Catholic primary school for years 1 to 8.

All these schools are coeducational, and all except Christ the King are state schools. Rolls are as of

Suburb
Burnside contains a central park (Burnside Park), and its two central roads are Memorial Avenue and Greers Road. It contains a smaller park (Jellie Park) opposite Burnside High School on Greers Road.

References

External links
Christchurch City Libraries — History of Bryndwr and Burnside

Suburbs of Christchurch